This is a partial list of association football stadiums in Portugal, ranked in order of capacity. The minimum capacity is 5,000.

See also
 List of association football stadiums by capacity
 List of European stadiums by capacity

References

stadiums by capacity
Football
Portugal